Over the years Roger Hodgson has released 3 studio albums, 2 live albums, and 8 singles.

Albums

Singles

Other recordings

DVDs
 Take the Long Way Home (2006)

Awards: 
 Canada - Multi-Platinum
 Germany - Gold
 France - Gold

References

External links
Unofficial discography of Roger Hodgson

Discographies of British artists
Rock music discographies